Radwan is a Polish knights' clan (ród) and a Polish coat of arms used by the szlachta (noble families within the clan).

Blazon
Gules: a Gonfanon or surmounted by a Maltese Cross of the last. Crest – on a crowned helmet – three ostrich feathers proper.

Arms: gules, a gonfannon ensigned of a cross in chief, and fringed in base, all or. Issuant of a helmet ducally crowned; for a crest, three ostrich plumes proper.

History

Radwan is among the most ancient coats of arms. Its origin traces to Polish and German nobility.

The most ancient seal dates from 1443 and the first record from 1409.  This coat of arms was widespread mainly in the regions of Kraków, Płock, Sandomierz, Sieradz, and also in Podlasie, Rawa, Ruthenia, and Lithuania. It exists in eight variants.

Families of magnate status (możni/high nobility) bearing Radwan arms were the Babski's, and the Magnuszewski's and Uchański's (See: Jakub Uchański), parts of the Mazovian feudal elite; however, many branches of the Radwans never transcended the status of middle and lesser nobility.

"In Poland, the Radwanice were noted relatively early (1274) as the descendants of Radwan, a knight [more properly a "rycerz" (German "ritter")] active a few decades earlier.  ..."

Kasper Niesiecki S.J. (1682–1744) in his "Herbarz Polski" (with increased legal proofs and additions by Jan Nepomucen Bobrowicz [1805–1881] in the Leipzig editions, 1839–1846) writes:

"It [Radwan coat of arms] was awarded during the reign of King Bolesław Smialy (1058–1079) on the occasion of a battle with Ruthenia; a captain named Radwan had been sent out on a foray with part of the army. He happened upon the enemy camp in such close quarters that they could neither protect themselves from a skirmish with the Ruthenians, nor fight with them, inasmuch as their numbers were so much smaller. But they all agreed it was better to fall dead on the spot than to encourage the enemy by fleeing. So with all their heart they sprang toward the Ruthenians, whose knights were daunted by this attack; but when they saw the small numbers against them, the Ruthenians grew bold, and not only took away their banner, but dispersed them as well. Captain Radwan, wishing to encourage his men to fight once more, rushed to a nearby church, where he seized the church's banner; he then gathered his men and courageously attacked the enemy. The Ruthenians took this to mean a new army with fresh troops had joined the battle, and began to retreat and flee. So Radwan's banner carried the day, and for this he received that church's banner for his shield, as well as other gifts.Paprocki, however, gives this as occurring during the rule of Bolesław Chrobry [992–1025] in 1021. He writes that Radwan was a royal chancellor, which information he is supposed to have taken from ancient royal grants. I conclude from this that either this clan sign is more ancient than the time of Bolesław Śmiały [1058–1079] and originated in the time of Bolesław Krzywousty [1102–1138], to whom some authors ascribe its conferment on that aforementioned Radwan; or else that before the time of Bolesław Śmiały [1058–1079] the Radwans used some other arms in their seal: for instance, that Radwan whom Paprocki gives as Bishop of Poznań in 1138. Długosz, in 'Vitae Episcop. Posnan. [Lives of the Bishops of Poznań]' does not include him under Radwan arms, but Sreniawa; there I, too, will speak of him."

From Little Poland, the Śreniawa family/gens was insignificant and financially modest; however, King Kazimierz the Great (1310–1370) supported them in Little Poland.

Radwan, Bishop of Poznań, assisted with the establishment of the first Commandery of the Knights of Saint John in Poznań circa 1187 or possibly May 6, 1170. The donation was made by Mieszko III Stary (1121? – 1202), High Duke of all Poland.

Ancient Origins and Reason for Many Surnames

See: Szlachta: Origins of szlachta surnames.

The Polish state paralleled the Roman Empire in that full rights of citizenship were limited to the nobility/szlachta. The Polish nobility/szlachta in Poland, where Latin was written and spoken far and wide, used the Roman naming convention of the tria nomina (praenomen, nomen, and cognomen) to distinguish Polish citizens/nobles/szlachta from the peasantry and foreigners, hence why so many surnames are associated with the Radwan coat of arms.

Nomen (nomen gentile—name of the gens/ród or clan):

Radwan

Cognomen (name of the family sept within the gens):

For example—Braniecki, Dąbrowski, Czcikowski, Dostojewski, Górski, Nicki, Zebrzydowski, etc.

Notable bearers

Notable bearers of this coat of arms have included:
 Dąbrowski Manor in Michałowice
 Jarosław Dąbrowski
 Stefan Tytus Dąbrowski

 Fyodor Dostoyevsky (Polish spelling "Dostojewski")

 Samuel Osiński
 Jakub Uchański
 House of Zebrzydowski
 Andrzej Zebrzydowski
 Mikołaj Zebrzydowski

Friedrich Nietzsche as Polish Nobleman Controversy: His Ring Bearing Radwan Coat of Arms

Friedrich Nietzsche wore a signet ring bearing the Radwan coat of arms. He often claimed his ancestors were Polish noblemen called either "Niëtzky" or "Niëzky," which was equated to the surname of the Polish family "Nicki" bearing the Radwan coat of arms. Gotard Nietzsche, a member of the Nicki family, left Poland for Prussia. His descendants later settled in the Electorate of Saxony circa the year 1700. All Saints' Church, in Wittenberg, Saxony, is where Martin Luther posted his Ninety-five Theses in 1517, according to Philip Melanchthon, which began the Protestant Reformation.

Nietzsche's statements:
"meine Vorfahren waren polnische Edelleute, noch die Mutter meines Großvaters war Polin"
transl.: "my ancestors were Polish noblemen, even my grandfather's mother was Polish"
– letter to Heinrich von Stein, c. beginning of December 1882
"Man hat mich gelehrt, die Herkunft meines Blutes und Namens auf polnische Edelleute zurückzuführen, welche Niëtzky hießen und etwa vor hundert Jahren ihre Heimat und ihren Adel aufgaben, unerträglichen religiösen Bedrückungen endlich weichend: es waren nämlich Protestanten."
transl.: "I was taught to ascribe the origin of my blood and name to Polish noblemen who were called Niëtzky and left their home and nobleness about a hundred years ago, finally yielding to unbearable suppression: they were Protestants."
– Nachlass, Sommer 1882 21 [2]

"Meine Vorfahren waren polnische Edelleute (Niëzky); es scheint, dass der Typus gut erhalten ist, trotz dreier deutschen "Mütter"."
transl.: "My ancestors were Polish noblemen (Niëzky); it seems that the type is well preserved in spite of three German "mothers""
– letter to Georg Brandes, April 10, 1888

"Und doch waren meine Vorfahren polnische Edelleute: ich habe von daher viel Rassen-Instinkte im Leibe, wer weiss? zuletzt gar noch das liberum veto. Denke ich daran, wie oft ich unterwegs als Pole angeredet werde und von Polen selbst, wie selten man mich für einen Deutschen nimmt, so könnte es scheinen, dass ich nur zu den angesprenkelten Deutschen gehörte."
transl.: "And yet my ancestors were Polish noblemen: it is owing to them that I have so much race instinct in my blood, who knows? perhaps even the liberum veto. When I think of how often I have been accosted as a Pole when traveling, even by Poles themselves, and how seldom I have been taken for a German, it seems to me as if I belonged to those who have but a sprinkling of German in them.
– Ecce Homo, Warum ich so weise bin (Why I am so wise) No. 3 (earlier version)

In her 1895 biography Das Leben Friedrich Nietzsche's, his sister Elisabeth Förster-Nietzsche discussed this, quoted the second statement above and told a longer version of the story, giving her aunts as a source. Also she says that not their great-grandfather (as Friedrich had claimed), but their great-great-grandfather had travelled from Poland to Saxony; that this travel had lasted three years, and that their great-grandfather was born in this time. Also she recalled a lost document called "La famille seigneuriale de Niëtzky" in which it was stated that a member of the family had to flee from Poland in 1716. In her 1895 retelling of the story, Förster-Nietzsche did not state clearly whether she thought it to be true or a family myth. Many Nietzsche biographies until today have used Förster-Nietzsche's book as a source.

In 1898, Hans von Müller did some research concerning the Nietzsches' origins. He found that Nietzsche's great-grandfather was born on February 26, 1714 (8 o'clock in the morning) in the town of Bibra and was given the name Gotthelf Engelbert some days later. His father, Nietzsche's great-great-grandfather, was named Christoph and had lived in Bibra since at least 1709. At that time, Müller could not find earlier evidence or the family birth name of Christoph Nietzsche's wife, but nevertheless published his results. In a private talk with Elisabeth, he jokingly said that if the lost document had put the events in 1706, not 1716, there would at least have been a possibility of it being true.

He was quite surprised when Elisabeth published a harsh rejection of his essay and there stated that she "just sees from an old notebook" that the lost document had really put the events in 1706, not 1716. Although she accepted Müller's evidence, she found it mysterious why the family name of Christoph Nietzsche's wife was "concealed" in the old church books. [Elisabeth's appearing and disappearing "old notebooks" have often been a very practical source for her statements].

In 1905, a Polish writer named Bernhard Scharlitt began to take interest in Nietzsche's family history and wrote letters to Elisabeth Förster-Nietzsche. In the book Herbarz polski, he found a small note about a family "Nicki" belonging to the Radwan coat of arms, and conjectured that some Gotard Nietzsche had migrated from Poland to Prussia c. 1632, and that his descendant Christoph Nietzsche in 1706 had merely changed Prussia with Saxony.

He wrote this to Elisabeth Förster-Nietzsche, who quickly dismissed all her earlier conjectures, even the religious suppression so important to her brother, and also found "after thorough research" that in fact her brother had always written (two-syllable) "Nicki" and never the three-syllable form "Niëzky". [An obvious lie, see the above quotations by Nietzsche]. Scharlitt was full of joy and published his conjectures and Elisabeth's letters in a Polish-patriotic article.

However, in her new 1912 biography Der junge Nietzsche, Elisabeth did not repeat her enthusiastic support for Scharlitt's conjectures – perhaps they had become inopportune in rising German nationalism. She now wrote "Nicki" but nevertheless claimed that phonetically it would be "Niëzky" with three syllables; she changed (that is, forged) her brother's 1882 fragment (second quotation on top) from "etwa vor hundert Jahren" (about hundred years ago) to "vor mehr als hundert Jahren" (more than hundred years ago), but in the end said that she does not know anything for sure because "papers have been lost".

What Scharlitt and Förster-Nietzsche did not know was that Hans von Müller after her strong rejection had abstained from an open debate, but had quietly pursued his research in old churchbooks, and that he was successful. His results are:

Nietzsche's great-great-great-great-grandfather:
Mattheß Nitzsche, lived in Burkau
Nietzsche's great-great-great-grandfather:
Christoph Nitzsche [I.], baptized May 15, 1662, Burkau; married to Anna Grüner, daughter of Hanß Grüner
Nietzsche's great-great-grandfather:
Christoph Nitzsche [II.], first marriage in 1707 in Eckartsberga, living in Bibra at least since 1709, died January 5, 1739, lower tax official in Bibra
First marriage with Johanna Christiana Büttner, daughter of Johann Dietrich Büttner from Eckartsberga
Second marriage with Margaretha Elisabetha Schönermarckin [the one whose family name Elisabeth rumoured to be "mysteriously concealed"], daughter of Ludwig Heinrich Schönermarck in Sondershausen)
Nietzsche's great-grandfather:
Gotthelf (or Gotthilf) Engelbert Nitzsche, born February 26, 1714, in Bibra, died September 21, 1804, in Bibra, succeeded his father as lower tax official); is from Christoph's [II.] first marriage, not from the second one as Müller had conjectured in 1898.
(First) marriage with Johanne Amalie Herold, born November 10, 1717, in Reinsdorf, died September 17, 1770, in Bibra, married July 19, 1740)

Their seventh child was
Nietzsche's grandfather:
Friedrich August Ludwig Nitzsche (or Nietzsche), born January 29, 1756, in Bibra, died March 16, 1826, in Eilenburg, a Lutheran pastor
First marriage with Johanne Friederike Richter, married July 6, 1784, in Bibra)
Second marriage with Erdmuthe Dorothee Krause (born December 11, 1778, in Reichenbach, died Naumburg April 3, 1865 – Nietzsche knew her – married October 9, 1809, in Naumburg)

Nietzsche's father Carl Ludwig Nietzsche, from the second marriage and also a Lutheran pastor, born October 10, 1813, is well known.

Hans von Müller wrote down the story of the legend and his results in a private manuscript between 1935 and 1937. The manuscript was published for the first time in 2002

Max Oehler also published an article about this in 1937/1938 (see article on Oehler). Whereas one should remain sceptical about Oehler, who was a devote Nazi, Hans von Müller's text is clearly not written in favour of some Nazi ideology. But Oehler's and Müller's results are essentially identical, Oehler only gives three more ancestors: Mattheß' father Hans Nitzsche, born c. 1620–1630; Hans' father Elias Nitzsche, born c. 1600; and Elias' father, name unknown, born c. 1570, all in Burkau. Both Oehler and Müller did not exclude a Slavic origin of the family; however, Müller suggests Sorbian rather than Polish origin.

As a possible source for the family myth Nietzsche's aunts believed in, Müller suggests Adam Nietzki (1714–1780), professor of medicine in Halle and of Polish (but not noble) origin, and Christoph Niczky, of Hungarian nobility, both of whom were not further related to the family Nietzsche.

Modern Nietzsche scholarship does not believe in the legend of noble Polish ancestry. For example, in the Colli-Montinari edition of Nietzsche's letters, the commentary on the above quoted letter to Brandes shortly notes:
"diese von N gepflegte Legende entbehrt jeder Grundlage"
transl.: "this legend maintained by N lacks any basis"

Footnotes

External links 
 Stockholms Auktionsverk - Friedrich Nietzsche: His Ring Representing the Radwan Coat of Arms, Which Ended Up in Sweden
  Radwan Coat of Arms, variants & bearers

See also
 Polish heraldry
 Heraldry
 Coat of Arms

Clan of Radwan
Cultural history of Poland
Polish coats of arms
Polish heraldry